Whatever People Say I Am, That's What I'm Not is the debut studio album by English rock band Arctic Monkeys, released on 23 January 2006 by Domino Recording Company and on 21 February 2006 in the United States. The album includes their first two singles "I Bet You Look Good on the Dancefloor" and "When the Sun Goes Down", as well as re-recorded versions of both tracks from the band's debut EP, Five Minutes with Arctic Monkeys. This is the only Arctic Monkeys album with bassist Andy Nicholson, as he left the band shortly after the album's release.

Forming in 2002, Arctic Monkeys frequently gave away free demo CDs to fans at gigs, which resulted in fans uploading the band's music to social media sites. As their attention hugely grew, the band had garnered great demand from fans, the press and the music industry. Several of the album's tracks had been released for free via the Internet in late 2004, which consolidated on the unofficial Beneath the Boardwalk compilation. Musically, Whatever People Say I Am, That's What I'm Not features indie rock, garage rock revival, post-punk revival, punk rock, alternative rock, and Britpop. Its thematic content has been likened to a concept, generally concerning nightlife, including lyricism surrounding clubbing and pub culture, and romance from the perspective of young Northerners.

Prior to the release of Whatever People Say I Am, That's What I'm Not, Arctic Monkeys achieved their first UK number-ones with "I Bet You Look Good on the Dancefloor", which was the most acclaimed song of 2005, and "When the Sun Goes Down". The album became the fastest selling debut album in British music history, selling over 360,000 copies in its first week, and remains the fastest selling debut album by a band. It has since gone 7× platinum in the UK. In the US, it also became the second-fastest selling independent record label debut album in history and was certified gold by the RIAA for selling 500.000 copies there.

The album received widespread critical acclaim from critics for its depiction of youth British culture and for resurging British indie music that had waned after the 1990s. Among its accolades included being named the best album of 2006 by Time magazine, winning the Brit Award for Best British Album, winning the 2007 Mercury Prize, and receiving a Grammy Award nomination for Best Alternative Music Album. It has been ranked in several greatest albums lists', including 371 in Rolling Stones 500 Greatest Albums of All Time, 19 in NME's 500 Greatest Albums of All Time, and 30 in Rolling Stone's 100 Best Debut Albums of All Time.

Composition and content
Musically, Whatever People Say I Am, That's What I'm Not features indie rock, garage rock revival, post-punk revival, punk rock, alternative rock, and post-Britpop. The common thematic content of the album has led to it being considered by some a concept album concerning "the lives of young Northern England clubbers". All tracks record first-person narratives of observations made within this context. "I Bet You Look Good on the Dancefloor", "Still Take You Home", "You Probably Couldn't See for the Lights but You Were Staring Straight at Me" and "Dancing Shoes" all examine human behaviour in nightclubs. Frontman Alex Turner describes "Dancing Shoes" as being about "people always looking to pull when they go out however much they mask it."

Other songs examine other aspects of nightlife; "From the Ritz to the Rubble" is an account of nightclub bouncers, "Red Light Indicates Doors Are Secured" tells the typical experiences and troubles of getting a taxicab after a night out, and "When the Sun Goes Down" was inspired by prostitutes near the band's practice room in the Neepsend district of Sheffield. Other songs are themed on romantic relationships, such as "Mardy Bum", or youth subcultures, such as "Fake Tales of San Francisco" and "A Certain Romance". In NMEs list of the top 100 tracks of the decade, "A Certain Romance" was described as "a strangely even-handed song which starts out scorning local townies then appears to absolve them at the end of the song."

Title and artwork
The album's title was taken from a line from the novel Saturday Night and Sunday Morning written by Alan Sillitoe. The name was chosen after Turner recognised similarities between the two works and the appropriateness of the title. He said that "it's good because the book is called Saturday Night and Sunday Morning and that's kind of what the album is, so there's a link there. And also, there's a lot of people saying a lot of things about us and you don't have control over it." He also said that "songs including 'The View from the Afternoon', 'Dancing Shoes', 'Still Take You Home' and 'From the Ritz to the Rubble' all cover that bit of the weekend and feature the same character."
 
The album's cover is a black-and-white photograph of Chris McClure, a close friend of the band who is the lead singer for The Violet May and the brother of Reverend and The Makers lead singer Jon McClure, which was taken in the early hours of the morning at the Korova bar in Liverpool. The band had given him, his cousin, and his best friend £70 to spend on a night out. The image caused some controversy when Laurence Gruer of NHS Scotland criticised the cover for "reinforcing the idea that smoking is okay". The band's product manager denied the accusation, and in fact suggested the opposite: "You can see from the image smoking is not doing him the world of good." Billboard advertisements for the album used a similar image to the cover picture, but without the cigarette. Digitally, the album cover is often modified away from black-and-white.

Release and promotion
Forming in 2002, Arctic Monkeys frequently gave away free demo CDs to fans at gigs, which resulted in fans uploading the band's music to social media sites, and as their attention hugely grew, the band had garnered great demand from fans, the press and the music industry. Prior to the release of the album, the tracks "Mardy Bum", "I Bet You Look Good on the Dancefloor", "Fake Tales of San Francisco", "Dancing Shoes", "Still Take You Home", "Riot Van", "When the Sun Goes Down" (then known as "Scummy" or "Scummy Man") and "A Certain Romance" had been released for free via the internet in late 2004 and consolidated on the unofficial Beneath the Boardwalk compilation.

"I Bet You Look Good on the Dancefloor" was released as the first single from the album. The song debuted at number one on the UK Singles Chart in October 2005 for one week, knocking Sugababes' "Push the Button" off the top. "I Bet You Look Good on the Dancefloor" was the most acclaimed song of 2005. "When the Sun Goes Down" was released as the second single from the album in January 2006, also debuting at number one on the UK Singles Chart.

The original release date was 30 January 2006, but was brought forward to 23 January 2006 due to "high demand". Although the same was done with Franz Ferdinand, it was speculated that the move was an attempt to counter the effects of the album's leak onto online file-sharing sites. The re-recorded album versions had been leaked onto the internet by December 2005.

On the first day of its release, the album became the fastest-selling debut album in British history, selling just under 120,000 copies. By the end of the week, the album had sold 363,735 copies—more than the rest of the top 20 combined and making it the overall fastest selling debut album in British history. Its release in the United States on 21 February 2006 saw it become the second fastest selling debut indie album in history, turning over around 34,000 copies in its first week and achieving number 24 in the album charts and was certified Gold by RIAA for indicating sales of 500,000 copies in August 2017. The album also went to number one in Australia and Ireland. UK sales as of September 2013 stood at 1,475,982 copies. In February 2014, the album was certified 5× Platinum, and  7× Platinum by April 2022 for indicating sales of 2,100,000 copies.

"The View from the Afternoon" was expected to have been the band's third single, following UK number ones "I Bet You Look Good on the Dancefloor" and "When the Sun Goes Down", but the band announced in March 2006 that its next record would be a five-track EP, which thereby disqualified it from being listed in the UK Singles Chart and UK Albums Chart.

The track "Mardy Bum", while not released as a single, appeared on radio playlists throughout the UK in mid-2006, and is still played infrequently on BBC Radio 1 and some alternative rock stations such as Sirius XM's Sirius XMU. The track "A Certain Romance" was ranked number 90 in Pitchfork Medias Top 100 Tracks of 2006 and cited as the standout track. NME also placed "A Certain Romance" at 10 in their list of 100 Tracks of the Decade. In October 2011, NME placed it at number 140 on its list "150 Best Tracks of the Past 15 Years".

In the US, "Fake Tales of San Francisco" was released as the album's third single and peaked at number 30 on the Billboard charts.

Critical reception

Since its release, the album has received widespread acclaim from critics. On Metacritic, it has a weighted average rating of 82 out of 100 based on 33 reviews, indicating "universal acclaim". It featured highly in many year-end lists and has been hailed as a modern classic. Many critics and figures in the British media hyped the Arctic Monkeys and their rapid rise to acclaim through unconventional means and some even cited the Arctic Monkeys as revolutionising the way people find music as they built a fanbase on the basis of a few demos shared by fans through the internet. Critics hugely praised the album for its depiction of youth British Culture and for resurging British indie music that had waned after the 1990s.

NME declared the Arctic Monkeys "Our Generation's Most Important Band", and Alex Turner's lyrics and depiction of Sheffield, and the night lives of teenagers in particular, were praised, with him being labelled as a "master of observation" and USA Today writing "you probably won't hear a better CD all year long", calling it "utterly infectious". MusicOMH wrote that it was the sort of guitar rock that "makes you fall in love with music all over again" and along with many other critics cited "A Certain Romance" as the standout track and as being "a wonderfully articulate dissection of youth culture that belies Turner's tender years". It was, however, noted that some of the tracks which had previously been released on the internet as demos had lost some of their quality and "don't sound as good".

In 2013, seven years after its release, Rolling Stone wrote, "It turned out that all the Monkeys needed to conquer the world was scrappy, lager-fueled tunes about being young and bored in a bleak steel town [...] Thanks to Turner's big bag of creaky melodies and the band's snaggletoothed guitar attack, even America couldn't resist pub-punk gems like the raging, sexy "I Bet You Look Good on the Dance Floor."

Accolades

Awards and nominations 
 Winner of the Barclaycard Mercury Prize
 Best Album – Q Awards
 Album of the Year – NME
 Album of the Year – Crossbeat magazine (Japan)
 Album of the Year – Time
 Album of the Year – Hot Press (Ireland)
 Best International Album – Meteor Music Awards (Ireland)
 Best British Album – 2007 BRIT Awards
 Best British Group – 2007 BRIT Awards
Best Alternative Music Album – 2007 Grammy Awards

In 2009 the album placed at number 9 in MTV's 'Greatest Album Ever' online poll. The album was also included in the book 1001 Albums You Must Hear Before You Die. It was ranked 30 in Rolling Stone's 100 Best Debut Albums of All Time. As of May 2021, the album has remained on the UK Indie Chart for 706 weeks.

Track listing

Personnel 
Credits adapted from liner notes.
 
Arctic Monkeys
 Alex Turner – lead and backing vocals, lead and rhythm guitar, percussion
 Jamie Cook – rhythm and lead guitar, backing vocals
 Andy Nicholson – bass guitar, backing vocals
 Matt Helders – drums, percussion, backing vocals

Technical
 Jim Abbiss – production, recording, mixing 
 Alan Smyth – production , additional recording 
 Ewan Davies – recording
 Andreas Bayr – recording 
 Simon 'Barny' Barnicott – mixing 
 Owen Skinner – mixing assistance

Design
 Juno Liverpool – design
 Alexandra Wolkowicz – photography
 Andy Brown – photography

Charts

Weekly charts

Year-end charts

Decade-end charts

Certifications

Notes

References

External links

2006 debut albums
Albums produced by Jim Abbiss
Arctic Monkeys albums
Brit Award for British Album of the Year
Domino Recording Company albums
Mercury Prize-winning albums
Concept albums